Belinda is a feminine given name of unknown origin, apparently coined from Italian bella, meaning "beautiful". Alternatively it may be derived from the Old High German name Betlinde, which possibly meant "bright serpent" or "bright linden tree".

People
Belinda C. Anderson (born 1954), American academic administrator 
Belinda Ang (born 1954), a judge of the Supreme Court of Singapore
Belinda Bauer (disambiguation), several people
Belinda Bencic (born 1997), Swiss tennis player
Belinda Carlisle (born 1958), lead vocalist for the rock and roll band The Go-Go's and solo artist
Bilinda Butcher (born 1961), vocalist and guitarist of the alternative rock band My Bloody Valentine 
Belinda Clark (born 1970), Australian former cricketer.
Belinda Cordwell (born 1965), former tennis player from New Zealand
Belinda Cowling, French medical researcher
Belinda Effah (born 1989), Nigerian movie actress.
Belinda Emmett (1974–2006), Australian actress and singer.
Belinda Kirk, British entrepreneur and explorer
Belinda Lima, American-born Cape Verdean singer also known simply as "Belinda"
Belinda Mulrooney (1872–1967), Irish-American entrepreneur who made a fortune in the Klondike Gold Rush
Belinda Neal (born 1963), former member of the Australian Senate (1994–1998) and House of Representatives (2007–2010)
Belinda Noack (born 1977), Australian cricketer
Belinda Peregrín, a Spanish-born, naturalized Mexican singer and actress
Belinda Royall (born c.1713), slave
Belinda Snell (born 1981), Australian basketball player
Belinda Stewart-Wilson (born 1971), English actress
Belinda Stronach (born 1966), businessperson and former Member of Parliament in the Canadian House of Commons
Belinda Vernon (born 1958), former Member of Parliament of New Zealand
Belinda Wright (disambiguation), several persons

Fictional characters
 Belinda Cratchet, daughter of Bob Cratchet in Dickens, A Christmas Carol
 Belinda, the owner of the lock stolen in Alexander Pope's poem The Rape of the Lock
 Belinda, heroine of Maria Edgeworth's novel Belinda
 Belinda, in Henry Purcell's opera Dido and Æneas
 Belinda McDonald, played by Jane Wyman in the 1948 film Johnny Belinda
 Belinda, on the Canadian animated television show Mona the Vampire
 Belinda Peacock (née Slater), a minor recurring character in EastEnders
 Belinda, a cow and the title character of a book by Pamela Allen
 Belinda Blumenthal, main character of Rocky Flintstone's series Belinda Blinked

References

English feminine given names